Kepler-29 is a Sun-like star in the northern constellation of Cygnus. It is located at the celestial coordinates: Right Ascension , Declination . With an apparent visual magnitude of 15.456, this star is too faint to be seen with the naked eye. It is a solar analog, having a close mass, radius, and temperature as the Sun. Currently the age of the star has not been determined due to its 2780 light-year (850 parsecs) distance. As of 2016 no Jovian exoplanets of 0.9–1.4  have been found at a distance of 5 AU.

Planetary system
In 2011 an analysis of the first four months of data from the Kepler space telescope detected 1235 planetary candidates two of which orbited this star. Later study of the transit-timing variations of the system lead to the confirmation of both planets. The planetary orbits are lying in Orbital resonance to each other, with orbital period ratio being exactly 7:9.

References

Cygnus (constellation)
G-type main-sequence stars
738
Planetary transit variables
Planetary systems with two confirmed planets
J19532359+4729284